The Shops at Montebello (formerly "Montebello Town Center") is a shopping mall mainly located within the city limits of Montebello, California, with over 120 national and local retail outlets such as Aeropostale, Disney Store, Hollister, Victoria’s Secret and BJ's Restaurant & Brewery. A small portion of its eastern side is actually within the city limits of Rosemead. It features major department stores, children's stores, smaller shops such as beauty and bath stores, health stores and salons, as well as a small food court. The boundary line between Montebello and Rosemead runs through the eastern end of the mall. Policing is provided by the City of Montebello. It was managed by The Macerich Company before being sold to Simon Property Group in 2011. The mall features 758,504 sq ft of leasable retail space. As of 2019, Simon no longer owns the mall. Pacific Retail announced ownership of the mall on the company Instagram page on January 24, 2019.

The mall serves this ethnically diverse trade area with four department stores (JCPenney, two Macy's stores (the second being Macy's home), and Forever 21) and 160 shops, eateries and restaurants. The mall is located directly adjacent to State Route 60, between the Paramount Boulevard and San Gabriel Boulevard off-ramps.

Construction of the mall began in 1980 and was completed in 1985 by Donahue-Schriber. The mall opened for business for the 1985 holiday season. A comprehensive remodel was almost totally completed in 2009, in time for the winter holidays. The remainder of the remodel was completed in June 2010 and  includes an elegantly styled center court with more "high end" stores such as Coach fine leathers and Aldo fashion footwear. The mall was again remodeled in 2016. The food court was renovated along with enhanced entryways, landscaping, signage, and outdoor seating. The anchor store H&M was also remodeled.

The mall's original anchors were JCPenney, Mervyn's and May Company California. May Company became Robinsons-May in 1993. Macy's built a new store and opened as a fourth anchor in 2001. The Robinsons-May store became a Macy's in 2006, with the former Macy's building being remade into a Macy's Home store. Mervyn's went out of business in 2008 and became a Forever 21 in 2009.

Anchors
JCPenney (139,316 sq ft.)
Macy's (140,468 sq ft., formerly May Company and Robinsons-May)
Macy's Home (90,000 sq ft., formerly Macy's)
Forever 21 (87,061 sq ft., formerly Mervyn's)

References

External links
 The Shops at Montebello

Shopping malls in Southeast Los Angeles County, California
Simon Property Group
Montebello, California
Rosemead, California
1985 establishments in California
Shopping malls established in 1985